Azerbaijan competed at the 2008 Summer Paralympics in Beijing, China. The country's delegation consisted of eighteen competitors in four sports: judo, athletics, powerlifting, and shooting.

Before the games, President Ilham Aliyev announced cash prizes for Azerbaijanis who won a Paralympic medal. Gold medalists received 200,000 manat, silver medalists 100,000, and bronze medalists 50,000. The athletes' trainers also received a reward: 100,000, 50,000, and 25,000 manat for gold, silver, and bronze medals, respectively.

Medalists

Sports

Athletics

Men's track

Men's field

Judo

Men

Powerlifting

Shooting

See also
Azerbaijan at the Paralympics
Azerbaijan at the 2008 Summer Olympics

References

Nations at the 2008 Summer Paralympics
2008
Paralympics